Jan Risberg (born 5 April 1953) is a Swedish Grammis-awarded conductor, oboist and composer. Risberg has worked with several major orchestras including Royal Stockholm Philharmonic Orchestra, Malmö Symfoniorkester, Helsingborgs symfoniorkester, and Norrköpings Symfoniorkester. He is also the leader and conductor of the contemporary chamber ensemble Sonanza. He is one of the most prominent conductors within contemporary music in Sweden which has resulted in over 50 world premieres of pieces by composers such as Georg Riedel and Benjamin Staern.

In 2010, Risberg and Sonanza won the Grammis award in the category "best classical" album. One year later, he received Swedish Society of Composers's "interpretation-price".

As oboist, Risberg has been playing with orchestras such as Kungliga Filharmoniska Orkestern, Stockholms Blåsarsymfoniker and musicians like the Swedish guitar virtuoso Göran Söllscher. Risberg also appeared as a guest musician on Voulez-Vous, the sixth studio album by Swedish pop group ABBA.

Risberg is also conductor and teacher of the music programme at Södra Latin and Royal College of Music, Stockholm.

Compositions
Improvata
Divertimento
Lovsången som inte kan tystna
Cristall
5 Intermezzi
Fylgia
Klädnaden
Tales
Shadows

Pieces with world-premiere conducted by Risberg

with Sonanza
Tidslinje / Henrik Strindberg
Divertimento / Anders Nilsson
Fantasia över ett ackord av B.A. Zimmermann / Benjamin Staern
Rondo / Thomas Jennefelt
Moonwalker / Mirjam Tally
Le cimetière marin II / Djuro Zivkovic
In su / Martin B Svensson
Ankh / Fredrik Hedelin
Mad cow Donalds : kammaropera / Jonas Klingborg
Ett porträtt = A portrait / Daniel Börtz
Frameworks : a furore norrmannorum libera nos Domine / S Patric Simmerud
Bilder / Henrik Strindberg
Le cimetière marin / Djuro Zivkovic
Gilded splinters / Mattias Lysell
Déja-vu – over and over again / Pär Frid
Nattens djupa violoncell / Benjamin Staern
Con-Sonanza / Cristian Marina
Deklaranterna / Magnus Bunnskog
Musik till en katedralbyggare = Music to a cathedral-builder / Thomas Jennefelt

With Södra Latins Chamber choir 
En mans väg hos en ung kvinna / Henrik Strindberg
Faseliga drömmar / Kristofer Lundin
The Life You Can Save / Gustav Alexandrie
Lyte / Gustav Alexandrie
Genom luft och brus / Benjamin Staern
Womb / Robin Rolfhamre
L'arm – sånger utan ord / David Lennartsson
Go cycle / Pär Frid

with others 

People's voice : kammaropera / Malin Bång
Springtime / Björn Sikström
Ur en dalglaciär / Hans Höglund
En liten ljusglimt = A small gleam of light / Hardi Kurda
Fanfare for wind orchestra / Lennart Westman
Den sovande staden / Georg Riedel
A et B – Machaut reveries / Magnus Bunnskog
Lines for Jenny / Adrian Knight
Ethnical paraphrases / Moris Cengic
Konsert Guitar concerto / Johannes Jansson 
S:t Sebastians blick : kammaropera /  Magnus Bunnskog
Tystnad : Kantat / Werner Wolf Glaser
Six inter, ludes / Sven-David Sandström
Liquidations / Martin B Svensson

References 

1953 births
Living people
Swedish conductors (music)
Male conductors (music)
Contemporary classical music in Sweden
21st-century conductors (music)
21st-century Swedish male musicians